Huntingdon is a market town in the Huntingdonshire district in Cambridgeshire, England. The town was given its town charter by King John in 1205. It was the county town of the historic county of Huntingdonshire. Oliver Cromwell was born there in 1599 and became one of its Members of Parliament (MP) in 1628. The former Conservative Prime Minister (1990–1997) John Major served as its MP from 1979 until his retirement in 2001.

History
Huntingdon was founded by the Anglo-Saxons and Danes. It is first mentioned in the Anglo-Saxon Chronicle in 921, where it appears as Huntandun. It appears as Huntedun in the Domesday Book of 1086. The name means "The huntsman's hill" or possibly "Hunta's hill".

Huntingdon seems to have been a staging post for Danish raids outside East Anglia until 917, when the Danes moved to Tempsford, now in Bedfordshire, before they were crushed by Edward the Elder. It prospered successively as a bridging point of the River Great Ouse, a market town, and in the 18th and 19th centuries a coaching centre, notably at the George Hotel. The town has a well-preserved medieval bridge that used to serve as the main route of Ermine Street over the river. The bridge only ceased to be the sole crossing point to Godmanchester in 1975, with the building of what is now the A1307 (formerly A14) bypass.

The town's valuable trading position was secured by Huntingdon Castle, of which only the earthworks of the motte survive. The site is a Scheduled Ancient Monument and home to a beacon used to mark the 400th anniversary of the Spanish Armada.

In 1746, the nurserymen Wood and Ingram of nearby Brampton developed an elm-tree cultivar, Ulmus × hollandica 'Vegeta', which they named the Huntingdon Elm after the town.

Original documents on Huntingdon's history, including the borough charter of 1205, are held by Cambridgeshire Archives and Local Studies at the County Record Office, Huntingdon.

Parts of Huntingdon, including the centre, were struck by an F1/T3 tornado on 23 November 1981, during a record-breaking nationwide tornado outbreak on that day. The centre suffered moderate damage.

Between the railway station and the old hospital building, stands a replica cannon installed in the 1990s to replace one from the Crimean War, scrapped for the war effort in the Second World War. However, it faces in the opposite direction from the original. St Mary's Street drill hall was built in the late 19th century.

George Hotel
The George Hotel on the corner of High Street and George Street was once a posting house. It was named after Saint George of England in 1574 and bought some 25 years later by Henry Cromwell, grandfather of Oliver Cromwell. Charles I made the George his headquarters in 1645. Later the highwayman Dick Turpin is said to have been a customer, when it was a coaching inn on the Great North Road. A theatre was built to the rear of the George about 1799. The Lincoln company of actors managed by Thomas Shaftoe Robertson and later Fanny Robertson performed here in race weeks. Two wings of the inn burnt down in the mid-19th century, but two were saved, including one with a balcony overlooking the yard. Since 1959, the courtyard and balcony have been used for Shakespeare performances by a company run by the Shakespeare at the George Trust.

Government
Huntingdon has a town council with 19 councillors elected every four years. Two of them serve also as mayor and deputy mayor. Meetings are normally held once a month at Huntingdon Town Hall.

Huntingdonshire District Council has three wards: Huntingdon North, Huntingdon East and Huntingdon West. The Huntingdon East ward has two councillors and the other wards also have two each. The main offices of Huntingdonshire District Council are in Huntingdon itself.

The third tier of local-government is Cambridgeshire County Council providing county-wide services such as roads, education, social services, libraries and heritage protection. Huntingdon is one of 60 electoral divisions, represented by two county councillors.

The fourth tier of local government is Cambridgeshire and Peterborough Combined Authority, which is headed by a mayor. The Authority's website states that "the Mayor of Cambridgeshire & Peterborough is Dr Nik Johnson.

Huntingdon lies in the parliamentary constituency of Huntingdon.

Geography
The town lies on the north bank of the River Great Ouse opposite Godmanchester and close to the market town of St Ives to the east and the village of Brampton to the west. Huntingdon incorporates the village of Hartford to the east and the developing areas of Oxmoor, Stukeley Meadows and Hinchingbrooke to the north and west.

Between Godmanchester, Huntingdon and Brampton lies Portholme Meadow, England's largest. Its  contain many rare species of grass, flowers and dragonfly. It is the only known British habitat of the marsh dandelion. It acts as a natural reservoir for water in times of flood, enabling the river to run off slowly, so helping to preclude flooding in nearby towns. It has also served as a horse racecourse and once was a centre for aviation.

Business
Huntingdon is home to many local businesses, including Huntingdon Racecourse. Hinchingbrooke Business Park also contains offices and warehouses.

Climate
More recently Monks Wood,  to the north-west, has also provided data.

Like most of Britain, Huntingdon has a temperate, maritime climate free of temperature extremes, with rainfall spread fairly evenly over the year.

Typically 43.2 nights of the year report an air frost.

With annual rainfall at under  a year, the Huntingdon area is among the driest in the UK – 103.4 days on average record at least 1 mm of rain. All averages mentioned refer to the period 1971–2000.

Demography

Population
Between 1801 and 1901, the current area of Huntingdon consisted of four parishes: Huntingdon All Saints, Huntingdon St Benedict, Huntingdon St John and Huntingdon St Mary. The populations of these were counted in the ten-year UK census and ranged in the period between 2,368 in 1801 and 4,735 in 1891. (The census was omitted in 1941.)

All population census figures are taken from the report Historic Census figures Cambridgeshire to 2011 by Cambridgeshire Insight. For the censuses of 1961 and 1971, Huntingdon was combined with Godmanchester.

Culture and community
The former Literary and Scientific Institute is now Commemoration Hall.

There are two RAF stations within  of the town: RAF Brampton, once home to Headquarters RAF Support Command closed in 2013; RAF Wyton, once a major flying station but now also part of the DLO; and RAF Alconbury currently occupied by the United States Air Force.

Part of the medieval infirmary hall of St Johns in the market place became Huntingdon Grammar School. It was attended by Cromwell and by the diarist Samuel Pepys. The building is now the Cromwell Museum, run by Cambridgeshire County Council.

Legends
Hinchingbrooke House, once a convent, is said to be haunted. The bridge over the Alconbury Brook named Nun's Bridge is said also to be haunted, by one of the nuns who once lived at the convent. She is said often to be accompanied by another ghost that resembles a nurse. The myth goes that the nun had a monk-lover who caused them to be murdered.

Education
The local primary schools are Hartford Junior School, Huntingdon Primary School, Thongsley Fields Primary School, St John's Primary School, Stukeley Meadows Primary School and Cromwell Academy Primary School. Spring Common School is a special-needs school. Secondary schools include St Peter's School and Hinchingbrooke School. Further education colleges include Huntingdonshire Regional College, Hinchingbrooke School sixth-form college and St Peter's sixth form.

Transport

Rail
Huntingdon railway station has direct services to London Kings Cross station, trains take just over an hour on modern trains. It is served by Great Northern. Thameslink services between Horsham in West Sussex and Peterborough via Blackfriars and St Pancras in London run every half hour.

Bus
There are direct bus services to Peterborough, St Neots, Ramsey, St Ives and Cambridge, and within the town and to Hinchingbrooke Hospital. Most buses are provided by Stagecoach East and Whippet.

Air
Luton and Stansted airports are within .

Religious sites
There are four Church of England churches in Huntingdon, once there were more, which together with those in the adjacent villages Great and Little Stukeley are members of the Huntingdon Team Ministry in the Diocese of Ely. The four are All Saints' (next to the Market Square), St Mary's (opposite Pathfinder House), St Barnabas (on the Oxmoor estate) and All Saints', Hartford.

Huntingdon Methodist Church is in the High Street. Medway Christian Fellowship is based on Medway Road.

Sport
The highest-ranking football club, Huntingdon Town, plays in the United Counties League. Huntingdon United RGE plays in the Cambridgeshire League.

Notable residents
Names are in birth order. Data are from the subject's Wikipedia article except where referenced.

Arts and entertainment
Henry Compton (Charles Mackenzie, 1805–1877), actor, born in Huntingdon
George Mackley (1900–1983), wood engraver, born in Huntingdon
Terry Reid, (born 1949), rock vocalist and guitarist, born in Huntingdon
The Charlottes (formed 1988), indie rock band formed in Huntingdon.
Ceara O'Neill (born 1990), actor and musician, born in Huntingdon
Himesh Patel (born 1990), actor, born in Huntingdon

Literature
Henry of Huntingdon (c. 1088–1157), historian (Historia Anglorum) and Archdeacon of Huntingdon.
Samuel Pepys (1633–1703), diarist, attended Huntingdon Grammar School in about 1644.
Basil Montagu (1770–1851), jurist, barrister, writer and philanthropist, and illegitimate son of John Montagu, 4th Earl of Sandwich and Martha Ray
Robert Carruthers (1799–1878), local historian (History of Huntingdon) and journalist

Religion
Christina of Markyate (c. 1096–98 – c. 1155), anchoress and prioress, was born in Huntingdon.
John Swanel Inskip (1816–1884), American minister and evangelist, was born in Huntingdon.

Politics

David, Earl of Huntingdon (c. 1144–1219), Scottish prince, was born in Huntingdon.
Richard Patrick (died 1566), MP for Huntingdon in 1559
Oliver Cromwell (1599–1658), Lord Protector, was born in Huntingdon.
Edward Montagu, 1st Earl of Sandwich (1625–1672), English Civil War general and Restoration politician, attended Huntingdon Grammar School.
Richard Cromwell (1626–1712), Lord Protector (1658–59), was born in Huntingdon.
Henry Cromwell (1628–1674), Lord Deputy of Ireland and chancellor of Trinity College, Dublin, was born in Huntingdon.
Charlie Elphicke (born 1971), Conservative member of Parliament for Dover 2010–19, was born in Huntingdon.

Science and engineering
Michael Foster (1836–1907), physiologist and academic, was born in Huntingdon.
Robert William Edis (1839–1927), architect and writer on decoration, was born in Huntingdon and educated at Huntingdon Grammar School.
Walter Samuel Millard (1864–1952), naturalist and conservationist, was born in Huntingdon.

Sports
Walter Yarnold (1893–1978), first-class cricketer, was born in Huntingdon
Josh Gifford, (1941–2012), National Hunt jockey and trainer, was born in Huntingdon.
Oliver Gavin (born 1972), racing car driver, was born in Huntingdon.
Charlotte Edwards (born 1979), international women's cricketer, was born in Huntingdon.
Darren Bent (born 1984), footballer, was raised in Huntingdon.
Harriet Lee (born 1991), Paralympic swimmer, was born in Huntingdon.
James Sykes (born 1992), first-class cricketer, born in Huntingdon
James Kettleborough (born 1992), first-class cricketer, was born in Huntingdon.
Alex Martin (born 1992), first-class cricketer, was born in Huntingdon.
Todd Kane (born 1993), footballer, was born in Huntingdon.
George Furbank (born 1996), England international professional rugby union player was born in Huntingdon

International relations

Twin towns
 Salon de Provence, France
 Szentendre, Hungary
 Wertheim am Main, Germany
 Gubbio, Italy

Source:

Freedom of the Town
The following people and military units have received the Freedom of the Town of Huntingdon.

Individuals
 Gordon Peacock: 7 May 2022.
 Derek Bristow : 7 May 2022.

Military Units
 RAF Wyton: 17 September 1955.
 RAF Brampton: 1995.
 The Royal Anglian Regiment: 21 January 2010.
 The Princess of Wales's Royal Regiment: 23 November 2017. 
 The 501st Combat Support Wing, USAF: 21 September 2018.

See also
Earl of Huntingdon

References

External links

Huntingdon Town Council
 

 
Populated places on the River Great Ouse
Towns in Cambridgeshire
Huntingdonshire
County towns in England
Civil parishes in Cambridgeshire